Curl or CURL may refer to:

Science and technology
 Curl (mathematics), a vector operator that shows a vector field's rate of rotation
 Curl (programming language), an object-oriented programming language designed for interactive Web content
 cURL, a program and application library for transferring data with URLs
 Antonov An-26, an aircraft, NATO reporting name CURL

Sports and weight training
 Curl (association football), is spin on the ball, which will make it swerve when kicked
 Curl, in the sport of curling, the curved path a stone makes on the ice or the act of playing; see Glossary of curling
 Biceps curl, a weight training exercises
 Leg curl, a weight training exercises
 Wrist curl, a weight training exercises

Other uses
 Curl (Japanese snack), a brand of corn puffs
 Curl or ringlet, a lock of hair that grows in a curved, rather than straight, direction
 Consortium of University Research Libraries, an association of UK academic and research libraries
 Executive curl, the ring above a naval officer's gold lace or braid rank insignia

People with the surname
 Kamren Curl (born 1999), American football player
 Martina Gangle Curl (1906–1994), American artist and activist
 Robert Curl (1933–2022), Nobel Laureate and emeritus professor of chemistry at Rice University
 Rod Curl (born 1943), American professional golfer
 Phil Curls (1942–2007), American politician

See also
 Curling (disambiguation)
 Overlap (disambiguation)
 Spiral